Sphenophorus is a genus of weevils, often known as billbugs, in the family Curculionidae, and tribe Sphenophorini. Eleven species of billbugs infest managed turfgrass in North America.

Species

References 

 Catalogue of Life
 Wtaxa

 
 

Curculionidae genera
Rhynchophorinae
Dryophthorinae